Helmut Zilk (9 June 1927, Vienna – 24 October 2008, Vienna) was an Austrian journalist and politician in the Austrian Social Democratic Party. He served as mayor of Vienna between 1984 and 1994.

Biography 
Born in Vienna, Zilk was Mayor of Vienna from 1984 to 1994. In December 1993 he was severely injured when he opened a letter bomb which had been sent to his home in Innere Stadt by Franz Fuchs.

Zilk died on 24 October 2008 of heart failure, after arriving home sick from a vacation in Portugal. He was married to Austrian musical star, Dagmar Koller.

Czechoslovak secret police collaborator 
In October 1998, the newspaper Süddeutsche Zeitung accused Helmut Zilk of having collaborated with Czechoslovak secret police (StB) during the 1960s. He denied the accusations. Based on this and also on information from the StB archives, Zilk was denied a planned Czech medal of honour.  The affair was widely covered by Czech and Austrian media. In 1998 the Czech presidential office cleared Zilk and president Havel apologized to him in person.

In 2009, the StB documents on Zilk were made public. These documents record 58 meetings between Zilk and secret police agents during 1965–68. Zilk had provided information about the political situation in Austria and assessments of individual Austrian politicians; for this he was paid in money and goods such as Bohemian crystal glass. After the Soviet occupation of Czechoslovakia (August 1968) Ladislav Bittman, one of the agents in contact with Zilk, defected to the West and leaked information about him. Some Czech media (as well as the old StB documents) speculated that the continued political and journalistic career of Zilk, in spite of being uncovered, was due to some other agency (CIA is suggested) recruiting and supporting him.

References

External links 
 

|-
| width="30%" align="center" | Preceded by:Leopold Gratz
| width="40%" align="center" | Mayor of Vienna1984–1994
| width="30%" align="center" | Succeeded by: Michael Häupl
|-

1927 births
2008 deaths
Austrian amputees
Mayors of Vienna
Austrian people of German Bohemian descent
People from Favoriten
Knights Commander of the Order of Merit of the Federal Republic of Germany
Theodor Körner Prize recipients
Burials at the Vienna Central Cemetery
Recipients of the Order of the White Lion
20th-century Austrian journalists